Vahid Zimonjić (born 14 July 2000) is a Serbian footballer, who plays as a defender for Novi Pazar.

Club career

Novi Pazar
Born in Novi Pazar, Zimonjić came through the same named club academy. Passing all youth categories with the club, he joined the first team at the beginning of 2018 and spent the whole winter break off–season with senior squad. He made his debut for the club under coach Stevan Mojsilović in 16th fixture match of the 2017–18 Serbian First League campaign against Metalac Gornji Milanovac, played on 9 March 2018.

Career statistics

Club

References

2000 births
Living people
Sportspeople from Novi Pazar
Association football defenders
Serbian footballers
FK Novi Pazar players
Serbian First League players